Pleurohoplites is a genus in the ammonitid family Hoplitidae, found in middle Cretaceous (Upper Albian - Cenomanian) of Europe, and included in the subfamily Hoplitinae.

Pleurohoplites has a somewhat involute, compressed to rather inflated shell, with a rounded to subcoronate venter, that bears umbilical tubercles from which branch strong, un-looped, ribs that end in ventrolateral nodes, or are continuous to the siphonal line.

References

 R.C. Moore (ed), Treatise on Invertebrate Paleontology, Part L: Ammonoidea. Geological Soc of America and Univ. Kansas Press, 1957, p. L397-nb|398

Ammonitida genera
Hoplitidae
Fossil taxa described in 1921